The large moth family Gelechiidae contains the following genera:

Idiobela
Idiophantis
Irenidora
Iridesna
Ischnocraspedus
Ischnophenax
Ischnophylla
Isembola
Isochasta
Isophrictis
Issikiopteryx
Istrianis
Iulota
Ivanauskiella
Iwaruna

References

 Natural History Museum Lepidoptera genus database

Gelechiidae
Gelechiid